Jason Genao (born ) is an American actor. He is best known for his appearance as the character Ruby Martinez on the Netflix show On My Block.

Personal life
Jason Genao comes from a Dominican-American family in Jersey City, New Jersey. He graduated from William L. Dickinson High School.

Filmography

Film

Television

References

External links

  

1997 births
Living people
American male television actors